Caroline Chang Campos (born 1966 in Quevedo, Ecuador) is an Ecuadorian doctor and politician. She was Ecuadorian Minister of Public Health under President Rafael Correa. She currently is Executive Secretary of the Andean Health Organisation - Convenio Hipolito Anunue (ORAS CONHUE). She was re-elected in November 2012.

References

External links
Biography

1960 births
Living people
People from Quevedo, Ecuador
Ecuadorian physicians
Ecuadorian Ministers of Health
PAIS Alliance politicians
Catholic socialists
21st-century Ecuadorian women politicians
21st-century Ecuadorian politicians
Women government ministers of Ecuador